Köhn is a surname. Notable people with the surname include:

 Derrick Köhn (born 1999), German footballer
 Philipp Köhn (born 1998), German goalkeeper
 Rosemarie Köhn (1939–2022), Norway bishop

Surnames of German origin